Daniel Ung (born 19 October 1975) is a retired Swedish football defender.

References

1975 births
Living people
Swedish footballers
IF Elfsborg players
Association football defenders
Allsvenskan players
Place of birth missing (living people)